Henrik Flöjt (May 24, 1952, Kajaani – September 26, 2005) was a Finnish biathlete, world champion and Olympic medalist. He received a silver medal in 4 x 7.5 km relay at the 1976 Winter Olympics in Innsbruck. He became world champion in 1975 with the Finnish relay team. His brother Heikki Flöjt was also a biathlete.

References

1952 births
2005 deaths
People from Kajaani
Finnish male biathletes
Olympic biathletes of Finland
Biathletes at the 1976 Winter Olympics
Olympic silver medalists for Finland
Olympic medalists in biathlon
Biathlon World Championships medalists
Medalists at the 1976 Winter Olympics
Sportspeople from Kainuu